= Hinaishin =

Hinaishin (皮内鍼 Hinaishin) is a form of Japanese acupuncture treatment in which an extremely thin and short needle is inserted inside the skin tissue and detained for one or several days secured in place by an adhesive plaster.

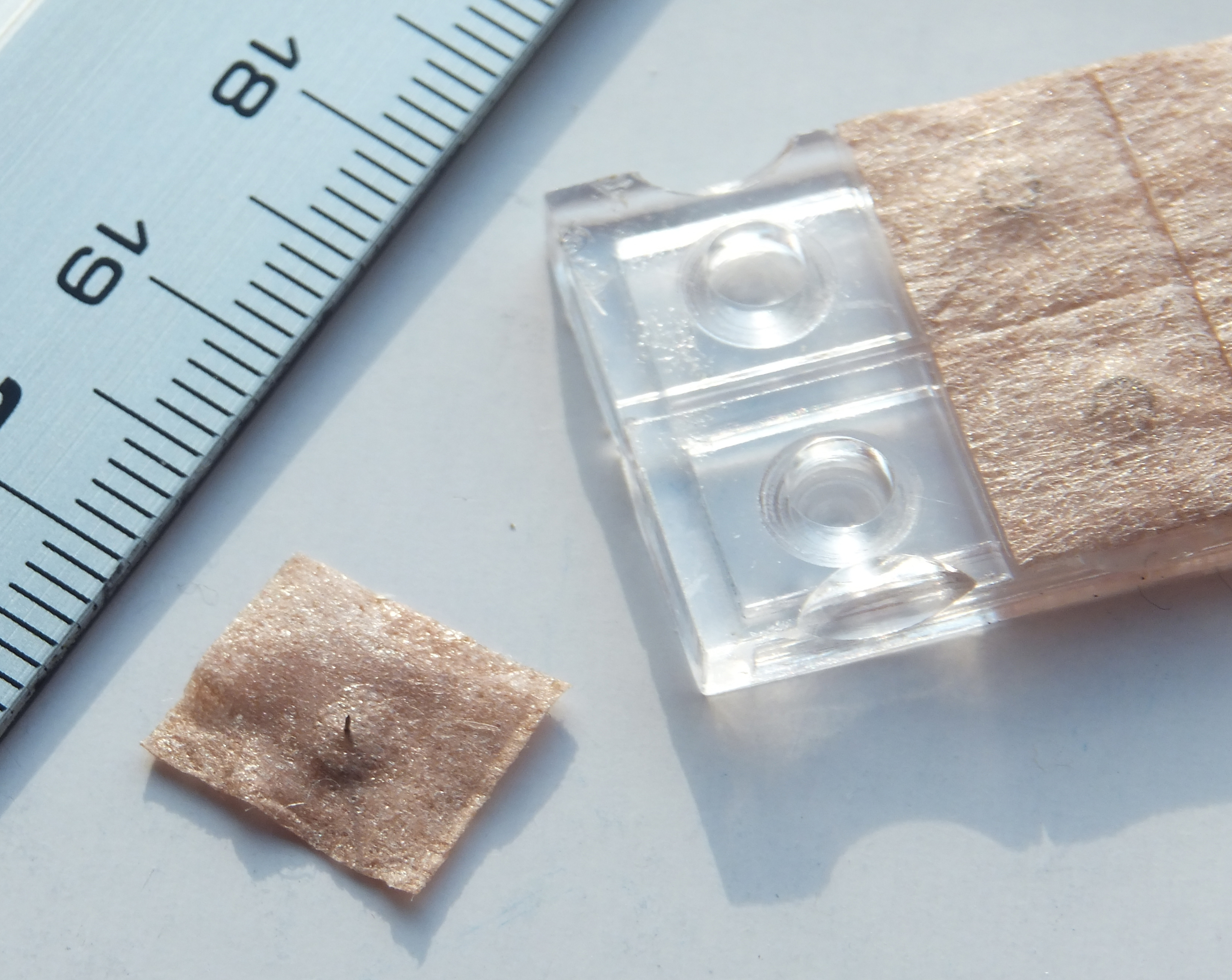
Hinaishin

== Shape of the Hinaishin needle ==
The needles used in the hinaishin method are about 5 mm in length and from 0.16 mm to 0.2 mm in diameter. The dragon head-shaped needle handle (竜頭 tatsugashira) is about 2 mm in length.
